South Africa is a tourist destination with the tourist industry accounting for 2.34% of GDP in 2019 followed by a sharp drop in 2020 to 0.81% of GDP due to lack of travel caused by the COVID-19 pandemic. The official marketing agency for the country South African Tourism is responsible for marketing South Africa to the world. According to the World Travel & Tourism Council, the tourism industry directly contributed ZAR 102 billion to South African GDP in 2012, and supports 10.3% of jobs in the country. The official national marketing agency of the South African government, with the goal of promoting tourism in South Africa both locally and globally is known as South African Tourism.

South Africa offers both domestic and international tourists a wide variety of options, among others the picturesque natural landscape and game reserves, diverse cultural heritage and highly regarded wines. Some of the most popular destinations include several national parks, such as the expansive Kruger National Park in the north of the country, the coastlines and beaches of the KwaZulu-Natal and Western Cape provinces, and the major cities like Cape Town, Johannesburg and Durban.

According to Statistics South Africa's latest Tourism and Migration Survey, almost 3,5 million travellers passed through the country's ports of entry in August 2017. The top five overseas countries with the largest number of tourists visiting South Africa were the USA, UK, Germany, the Netherlands and France. Most of the tourists arriving in South Africa from elsewhere in Africa came from SADC countries. Zimbabwe tops the list at 31%, followed by Lesotho, Mozambique, Eswatini and Botswana. In addition, Nigeria was the country of origin for nearly 30% of tourists arriving in South Africa.

Attractions

Biodiversity and ecotourism

South Africa is ranked nineteenth out of the world's twenty megadiverse countries south Africa is home to a large variety of animal life. Among the large mammals found in the northern bushveld include lions, leopards, cheetahs, white rhinoceroses, blue wildebeest, kudus, impalas, hyenas, hippopotamuses and giraffes. A significant extent of the bushveld exists in the north-east, including the Kruger National Park, one of the largest game reserves in Africa, and the Sabi Sand Game Reserve. The Kruger National Park, established in 1926, is one of the most visited national parks in the country, with a total of 1 659 793 visitors in the 2014/15 period. The region is also home to nearly 80 percent of the world’s rhino population. Due to covid-19 restrictions impeding tourism and movement in the region, the killings of rhino species in South Africa have fallen by 53 percent in 2020.

The country is also particularly rich in plant diversity, with a wide variety of biomes found across the country. These include the grasslands in the Highveld, the succulent Karoo in central South Africa, and the endemic fynbos biome, constituting the majority of the area and plant life in the Cape floristic region of the Western Cape. This rare vegetation is protected as part of the Table Mountain National Park (which also includes the iconic flat-topped Table Mountain), which was the most-visited national park in South Africa in 2014/15, with a total of 2 677 767 visitors.

Ecotourism

Cultural attractions

In addition to its numerous natural attractions, South Africa also boasts numerous attractions of cultural significance. These include the fossil-bearing caves forming part of the Cradle of Humankind in Gauteng, the ruins of the Kingdom of Mapungubwe in northern Limpopo, the wine routes of the Western Cape, and various historical sites in the cities of Cape Town and Johannesburg (such as Robben Island, the Castle of Good Hope and Soweto township).

UNESCO World Heritage Sites

Ten South African sites are inscribed on the UNESCO World Heritage List, including the iSimangaliso Wetland Park and uKhahlamba Drakensberg Park in KwaZulu-Natal. There are five Cultural WHS, four Natural WHS and 1 mixed WHS.

Visa policy

Visitors to South Africa must obtain a visa from one of the South African diplomatic missions unless they come from one of the visa exempt countries, in which case they get what is called a "Port of Entry Visa". Visitors who require a visa must apply in person and provide biometric data. See also the visa policy of South Africa.

Statistics

In 2014, a total of 9,549,236 tourists (overnight visitors) entered South Africa, indicating an increase of 0.1% from the 9,536,568 tourists recorded
in 2013. The highest number of arrivals was recorded in January of that year, while the lowest number was recorded in June. A vast majority (76.2%) of tourists arriving in the country were residents of SADC countries, 1.9% were from 'other' African countries and 23.6% were residents of countries overseas.

Foreign arrivals by year

Tourist arrivals by country

Tourism in Post-Apartheid South Africa

Prior to the Democratic Elections of 1994 
Before the end of apartheid, the nation was not largely celebrated as a tourist destination. As a result of the political unrest, the country faced difficulty in creating a highly-functioning tourism industry. Though the numbers indicate there was active tourism, it was not expansive and faced hardships as a result of the politics of the period.

1994–present 
In the years following the multiracial democratic election of 1994, South Africa opened its tourism horizons by hosting a variety of world wide events including the 1995 Rugby World Cup, and the 2010 FIFA World Cup. The hosting of these events helped bolster South Africa’s image and national identity.

South Africa, however, failed in their bid to host the 2004 Summer Olympics. Researchers have cited logistical and political reasons as to why the bid failed. For example, Cape Town was behind in the necessary means to support an event the size of the Olympics financially. Political reasons were also prevalent in the eventual failure of the bid as the committee was all-white and the motive to create a national identity seemed like a false promise to the majority black population of South Africa. The Bid Committee had issues of reconciliation and accusations of racism specifically between Raymond Ackerman, a wealthy white man who led the bid, and Sam Ramsamy who was of Indian descent. Therefore, in an attempt to enhance the tourism industry through an Olympics bid, the challenge of cohesive action posed a great threat. 

The 2010 Fifa World Cup is an example of a more successful route by South Africa to increase tourism and influence the nation positively. Firstly, the event helped to bolster South Africa’s global brand and image. One of the main objectives in South Africa’s attempt to host such events was to positively influence its national identity and erase the negative image of apartheid set forth prior to the nation’s gradual shift to become the self-proclaimed “Rainbow Nation.”

Other examples of tourism positively benefitting South Africa; generally have an underlying theme of supporting the cohesion of the nation following years of separation based on race. Some examples of the nation reinventing itself through the tourism industry include: the Apartheid Museum in Johannesburg, District Six Museum in Cape Town, and former prisons turned into powerful museums such as Constitution Hill and Robben Island which now attract many tourists every year.

Tourism in South Africa has not fully been inviting to the majority of people and reflects the legacy of apartheid that is internalised to this day. Townships, such as Alexandra, were hubs of black communities during the apartheid. After the period of apartheid, townships face the remnants of segregation including overcrowding and high levels of unemployment and crime. However, places such as Alexandra have become part of an initiative of ‘township tourism.’ The concept is meant to develop these townships by inviting tourists into the history of the locations and as a means to celebrate such places of culture.  “...The phenomenon of township tourism has opened up new tourism spaces in South Africa in the post-apartheid period and involves visits to symbolic sites of significance in the anti-apartheid struggle as well as enhancing the understanding of poverty in historically oppressed communities.” Additionally, township tourism is a strategy by the South African government to promote black establishments. One marker of post-apartheid tourism is the movement to bolster black economic empowerment. Some researchers claim that this consumption by tourists of township culture could be at the expense of local residents.

The reason for this breakage between the people in South Africa can be linked to policies during the apartheid restricting blacks from current tourist destinations and a general feeling of otherness by blacks that exists today. It’s not a controversial concept, however, as the civil society and South African members of the tourism private sector have supported the argument that Apartheid “..contributed to the lack of participation in domestic tourism by the youth,” specifically. Research has proven that blacks once effected by the apartheid still have that feeling of disconnect. Black youth, specifically, who experience poverty among other issues, deem tourism and travel to other parts of their own country as a white dominated activity. 

Today, South Africa’s tourism industry appears to be on a decline. Naturally occurring issues related to the environment and social issues such as crime rates are contributing factors to the nation’s tourism decline. This decline, however, is a dangerous entity given the importance of tourism for the economic growth of the nation and its continual efforts to rebrand the nation following the historic period of apartheid.

Black Owned Establishments 
An emergence of black-owned bed and breakfast establishments is a new phenomenon in the South African tourism industry that is a direct linkage to the legacy of the apartheid. These establishments mainly exist in former “black spaces” also known as townships. These bed and breakfast locations mainly benefit from domestic tourism in South Africa. The rise in these establishments’ significance is that the national government is increasingly looking to bolster black economic empowerment and the general structure of ownership of the tourism industry. “The first decade of the post-apartheid government has witnessed a number of steps taken towards policy framework and strategic development for transformation.” However, black owners of these establishments highlights the issues that exist still in the successful establishment and growth of tourism in this sector. Black entrepreneurs, and owners of such establishments still seek the government’s help to improve in fields such as finance, training, and “access to available support networks of business information and advice.”

See also 
 South African Tourism

References

External links

 Official Tourism Website
 South African National Department of Tourism

 
South Africa